Cristiano Ronaldo is a Portuguese professional footballer who has represented the Portugal national football team as a forward since his debut on 20 August 2003 against Kazakhstan in a friendly. He would later score his first international goal on 12 June 2004, during a UEFA Euro 2004 group stage match against Greece. Since then, he has become the current all-time record goalscorer for the Portugal national team, and the highest overall men's international goalscorer in history, having scored 118 goals in 196 appearances.

On 6 September 2013, Ronaldo scored his first international hat-trick against Northern Ireland during a 2014 FIFA World Cup qualifier. He has scored ten international hat-tricks, and on two occasions, four international goals in a single match. On 5 March 2014, Ronaldo scored twice in Portugal's 5–1 friendly win over Cameroon to take his tally to 49 goals, thus becoming his country's all-time leading goalscorer, surpassing the 47 set by Pauleta. He scored the only goal in a UEFA Euro 2016 qualifying match against Armenia on 14 November 2014, his 23rd goal in UEFA European Championship qualifying and finals matches, surpassing the record previously held by Turkey's Hakan Şükür and Denmark's Jon Dahl Tomasson. On 20 June 2018, Ronaldo scored his 85th goal for Portugal in a 1–0 win over Morocco at the 2018 World Cup, surpassing Hungary's Ferenc Puskás as the all-time top scorer for a European national team. On 8 September 2020, he scored his 100th and 101st goals for Portugal in a 2–0 win against Sweden in the 2020–21 UEFA Nations League, to become the first European player to reach this milestone. Ronaldo scored his 110th and 111th international goals in a 2022 World Cup qualifying win against the Republic of Ireland on 1 September 2021, surpassing Iran's Ali Daei as the outright leading scorer in men's international football.

Ronaldo has participated in twelve major international tournaments: five UEFA European Championships in 2004, 2008, 2012, 2016 and 2020 (played in 2021), five FIFA World Cups in 2006, 2010, 2014, 2018 and 2022, one FIFA Confederations Cup in 2017, and one UEFA Nations League Finals in 2019, scoring in all of them. Following Portugal's win at UEFA Euro 2016, Ronaldo lifted the trophy as his team's captain, and was also awarded the Silver Boot as the joint second-highest goalscorer of the tournament, with three goals and three assists; he was also named to the team of the tournament for the third time in his career. He has scored a record 14 goals at the European Championships, eight at the World Cup finals, seven in the UEFA Nations League and two at the Confederations Cup. Ronaldo has scored 36 goals in FIFA World Cup qualifiers and 31 goals in UEFA Euro qualifiers, hence becoming the first player to score more than fifty goals in European qualification matches. His other 20 goals have come in friendly matches. The opponent against whom he has scored most often is Luxembourg with nine goals. He has scored 16 international goals at Estádio Algarve, his most at a single ground. On 12 October 2021, Ronaldo scored his tenth international hat-trick, surpassing the record previously set by Sven Rydell with Sweden.

Goals

Scores and results list Portugal's goal tally first.

Hat-tricks

Statistics

See also

 List of career achievements by Cristiano Ronaldo
 List of men's footballers with 50 or more international goals
 List of men's footballers with 500 or more goals
 List of top international men's football goal scorers by country
 List of hat-tricks
 List of footballers with 100 or more caps
 List of footballers with the most official appearances
 List of most expensive association football transfers
 List of Portugal captains
 List of international goals scored by Eusébio
 List of international goals scored by Pauleta

References

External links

Cristiano Ronaldo – FPF competition record

History of the Portugal national football team
Goal
Ronaldo, Cristiano
International goals